The 2015 Piala Presiden (referred to as the President's Cup) is the 32nd season of the Piala Presiden since its establishment in 1985. The league is currently the youth level (U21) football league in Malaysia. Kelantan U21 are the defending champions.

Rule changes
The Piala Presiden is the amateur football competition in Malaysia for under-21 players. Since its inception in 1985, the Piala Presiden has been the major tournament for under-21 and under-23 players. In 2009, the format of the competition was changed with only under-20 players eligible to be fielded for the tournament. In 2015 the format of the competition reverted to the original format with under-21 players..

Teams
The following teams will be participate in the 2016 Piala Presiden. In order by the number given by FAM:-

  Perlis FA
  Kuala Lumpur FA
  Penang FA
  Melaka United
  Pahang FA
  Kedah FA
  PKNS F.C.
  PDRM FA
  ATM FA
  Felda United F.C.
  T-Team F.C.
  Johor Darul Ta'zim III F.C.
  Negeri Sembilan FA
  Selangor FA
  Terengganu FA
  Sarawak FA
  Kelantan FA
  Perak FA
  Sabah FA
  UiTM F.C.

Team summaries

Personnel and kits
Note: Flags indicate national team as has been defined under FIFA eligibility rules. Players and Managers may hold more than one non-FIFA nationality.

League table

Group A

Group B

Results
Results of the 2016 Piala Presiden season

Group A

Group B

Knock-out stage

Bracket

Quarterfinals

First Leg

Second leg

Kelantan U21 won 4–0 on aggregate and advances to Semifinals

Selangor U21 won 4–3 on aggregate and advances to Semifinals

Perak U21 won 2–1 on aggregate and advances to Semifinals

T-Team U21 won 2–1 on aggregate and advances to Semifinals

Semifinals

|-

First Leg

Second leg

Kelantan U21 won 3–1 on aggregate and advances to Final

T-Team U21 won 3–1 on aggregate and advances to Final

Final

First Leg

Second Leg

Winners with Aggregate result are Champions 2016 Piala Presiden

Champions

Goalscorer

Top scorers

See also

 2016 Malaysia Super League
 2016 Malaysia Premier League
 2016 Malaysia FAM League
 2016 Malaysia FA Cup
 2016 Piala Belia

References

External links
 Football Association of Malaysia
 SPMB 

5